Abadeh (also Romanized as Ābādeh) is a village in Ramjerd-e Do Rural District, Dorudzan District, Marvdasht County, Fars Province, Iran. At the 2006 census, its population was 283, in 60 families.

References 

Populated places in Marvdasht County